Disease ecology is a sub-discipline of ecology concerned with the mechanisms, patterns, and effects of host-pathogen interactions, particularly those of infectious diseases. For example, it examines how parasites spread through and influence wildlife populations and communities. By studying the flow of diseases within the natural environment, scientists seek to better understand how changes within our environment can shape how pathogens, and other diseases, travel. Therefore, diseases ecology seeks to understand the links between ecological interactions and disease evolution. New emerging and re-emerging infectious diseases (infecting both wildlife and humans) are increasing at unprecedented rates which can have lasting impacts on public health, ecosystem health, and biodiversity.

Factors affecting spread of diseases 
Parasitic infections, along with certain transmitted diseases, are present in wildlife which can have severe health effects on particular individuals and populations. Constant host-parasite interactions make disease ecology critical in conservation ecology.

Ecological factors 
Ecological factors that can determine the persistence and the spread of diseases are population size, density, and composition. Host population size is important in the context of host-parasite interactions since the spread of diseases needs a host population large enough to sustain parasitic interactions. The health of the overall population (and the size of the weakened population members) will also influence the way that parasites and diseases will transmit among members. Additionally, competition and predation dynamics in the ecosystem can influence the density of potential hosts which can either propagate or limit the spread of diseases.

Predator-prey interactions 
In some cases when a parasite has weakened an animal it will become easier prey for a predator species. Occasionally predators will prefer feeding on the sick or infected prey even though they carry a parasite because of the opportunity weak prey present. Without the presence of a predator species the prey species would likely exceed manageable numbers therefore leading to the rapid spread of pathogens throughout the prey population. Available host numbers increased when the infected individuals are not removed due to low predation. However, there are some situations where predator feeding can disturb a pathogen that previously was dormant leading to an epidemic that otherwise would not have occurred. Some parasites are able to survive when their host species is consumed leading to the parasite being distributed in the waste of the predator which can continue the spread of disease.

Parasitism 
Parasitism in disease ecology is important because it can shape the way many habitats function because they are disease carriers. These diseases can alter the timing of events, biogeochemical cycles, and even the flow of energy in a habitat. Parasites are able to limit population growth and reproduction of species which may lead to a shift in the balance of an ecosystem. Other ways parasites impact systems are through nutrient cycles. Parasites are able to create imbalances of the elements in a system through the relationship they have with a host and the host's diet.

Biological factors 
Biological factors that can determine the persistence of diseases include parameters pertaining at the level of the individual within the population (one single organism). Sex differences are found to be prevalent in disease transmission. For example, male American minks are larger and travel wider distances, making them more prone to come into contact with parasites and diseases. The host species age may additionally affect the rate in which diseases are transmitted. Younger members of populations have yet to acquire herd immunity and are therefore more susceptible to parasitic infections.

Anthropogenic factors 
Anthropogenic factors of disease spread can be through the introduction or translocation of wildlife for conservation purposes by humans. Additionally, human activity is changing the way in which diseases move through the natural environment.

In relation to anthropogenic factors 
Humans are strongly impacting how diseases spread by creating what is known as "novel species associations". Globalization, mainly through world travel and trade, has created a system in which pathogens, and other species, are more in contact with one another than before. Ecological disruption, including habitat fragmentation and road construction, degrade natural landscapes and have been studied as drivers of recent emergence and re-emergence of infectious diseases worldwide. Scientists have speculated that habitat destruction and biodiversity loss are some of the main reasons influencing the rapid spread of non-human, disease carrying vectors. The loss of predators, that mitigate the ability for pathogen transmission, can increase the rate of disease transmission. Human anthropogenic induced climate change is becoming problematic, as parasites and their associated diseases, can move to higher latitudes with increasing global temperatures. New diseases can therefore infect populations that were previously never in contact with certain pathogens.

Urbanization and biodiversity loss 

Urbanization is considered one of the main land-use changes, defined as the growth in the area and number of people inhabiting cities and creates artificial landscapes of built-up structures for human use. With over 65% of the global human population living in cities by 2025, ecological impacts of urbanization focuses mainly on biodiversity loss defined as the decline in species richness. With empirical evidence, scientists are understanding that biodiversity loss is associated with increased disease transmission and worsening of disease severity for humans, wildlife, and certain plant species. As biodiversity is lost worldwide, it is oftentimes the larger, slower reproducing animal species that will go extinct first. This leaves smaller, more adaptable, fast reproducing species abundant. Research has shown that these smaller species are more likely the ones to carry and transmit pathogens (key examples include bats, rats, and mice).

Invasive species 
Globalization, especially world trade and travel, has facilitated the spread of non-native species worldwide. Newly introduced invasive species have the ability to alter ecological dynamics through local and regional extinction of native species. This can promote changes to the ecosystem including the shift in abundance and richness of native species. New invasive species, and the diseases they potentially carry, can escape into the environment and alter the existing natural ecosystems and the ecosystem services that people are dependent upon, including water quality and nutrient availability.

Habitat fragmentation 

Encroachment on natural ecosystems and wildlife with rapid urbanization exposes humans to a wide variety of disease carrying animals. Habitat fragmentation leads to increased edge effects and increases the contact between different communities, vectors, and pathogens which can increase disease transmission. It is argued that between 2013 and 2015, the Ebola virus disease (EDB) outbreak in West Africa began due to deforestation and habitat degradation. In this case, frugivorous and insectivorous bat species had less forest serving as a barrier between them and dense human settlements. Transmission of the Ebola virus is believed to have occurred through direct contact with bat species carrying the pathogen and humans, encroaching on natural ecosystems.

Climate change 

Scientists have deemed vector borne diseases to be sensitive to changes in weather and climate. The abundance of disease carrying vectors in the environment depends on multiple factors, including temperature, relative humidity, and water availability, all factors necessary for the reproductive processes and success of disease carrying vectors. Climate change predictions include rising temperatures and changes in rainfall pattern which can create suitable habitats and increases the overall survival rate and fitness of pathogen carrying species. With a warming climate, pathogens and parasites can begin shifting their native geographic ranges to higher latitudes and infect host species in which they have no prior interaction with. The shift in rainfall patterns can additionally indicate the presence of disease carrying vectors. For example, mosquitos spread diseases such as malaria and lymphatic filariasis. The distribution of lymphatic filariasis via mosquitos can be determined by looking at soil moisture content, an indicator of viable mosquito breeding habitat (as mosquito larvae need shallow, stagnant water to survive). As temperature and precipitation patterns change, so will soil moisture levels and the corresponding mosquito populations.

As climate change continues to disrupt ecosystems around the world it can make both human and non-human populations more or less vulnerable to disease depending on the specific effects of climate change on the disease. The subject of climate change and its impact on disease is increasingly attracting the attention of health professionals and climate-change scientists, particularly with respect to malaria and other vector-transmitted human diseases. More specifically, climate change can impact malaria transmissions by extending the season of transmission and creating more breeding sites due to increasing temperatures and rainfall, respectively. Increases in malaria transmissions and other vector-transmitted human diseases can have a devastating impact on communities that do not receive appropriate medical care and on people who have not had exposure to these diseases.

In relation to tropical, northern temperate zones, and the Arctic 
It is thought that the effects of climate change on temperature will increase with latitude. This means that northern temperate zones will experience more temperature changes than tropical zones. Tropical zones experience less climate variability, so organisms in tropical zones have adjusted to a continuous climate. Therefore, slight disruptions in climate can dramatically affect the organisms in tropical zones. Climate change can affect organisms by elongating their reproductive cycles. In addition to this, climate change allows for pathogens to expand beyond tropical zones, dramatically impacting species because of the introduction of new pathogens. These impacted species include humans and human livestock.

Changes in northern temperate zones and the Arctic are also expected. More specifically, the effects of climate change on temperature increase with latitude, so the temperature in northern temperate zones is projected to increase and the temperature in the Arctic is projected to increase even more. Like tropical zones, climate change in northern temperate zones and the Arctic can also cause species to move beyond their original niche. For example, climate change has allowed elk to move north in areas that overlap with other species such as caribou. When the elk move, they introduce new pathogens into the area, thus harming the caribou.

Models and predicting disease ecology 
There are numerous approaches when predicting the impacts of climate change on diseases. Static approaches use reproduction rates to find how climate change will affect vectors. An example of the use of static approaches is a process-based model called MIASMA. This model explores the relationship between different climate change scenarios and the reproduction rate of vectors. This model has been used specifically to look at mosquitoes in African highlands to make predictions about the future of the development and feeding of mosquitoes. Additionally, this model can be used to find the population of mosquitoes that bite, allowing predictions of diseases such as dengue fever.

Another approach includes statistical based models, which relies on observations unlike process-based models. An example of this type of model is CLIMEX, which maps vector species over geographical locations while accounting for climate factors. It is important to note that this approach does have limitations. CLIMEX does not include all factors that impact vector species.

Time-series models can also be used to find how climate change will modify disease dynamics. However this approach has a downside; only a limited number of locations and pathogens can be looked at simultaneously using time-series models.

Predictions of ENSO (El Niño Southern Oscillation) can also help predict diseases. ENSO events can create cooler temperatures in the Western Tropical Pacific and warmer temperatures in the Central and Eastern Tropical Pacific leading to intense precipitation and storms. Changes in climate due to ENSO can affect the dynamics of diseases and can affect the water sources humans use. For example, in 1991, cholera reappeared in Peru around the same time as an el Niño event occurred. ENSO events can be anticipated early on, and therefore by predicting ENSO, predictions about disease transmission peaks can be made up to two months before they occur.

Notable examples in disease ecology

Malaria 
Malaria is a disease transferred by the female Anopheles mosquito, located predominantly in sub-Saharan Africa and is a long withstanding public health issue. It is a disease that is strongly regulated by climate factors and therefore climate change will have a notable impact on the transmission of the disease. As temperatures warm, the reproductive phase of the Plasmodium parasite, within the gut of the female mosquito, will undergo completion. This will ensure that the female mosquito becomes infective before the end of its lifespan. Precipitation is also a critical factor for the breeding and the transmission of malaria and with climate change influencing regular precipitation patterns, studies are finding that mosquito breeding potential can increase as a direct result of climate change.

Lyme disease 
Lyme disease is the most common tickborne disease throughout the United States and Europe with an estimated 476,000 cases in Europe and 200,000 cases in the United States per year. Recently, studies have concluded that there is an increased risk of Lyme disease in Southern Canada due to the home range expansion of the tick vector Ixodes scapularis, which is responsible for carrying the disease. Climate change creates milder winters and extended Spring and Autumn seasons. This creates hospitable habitats for ticks thrive at higher latitudes (where they are normally not found). Human infections of Lyme disease have been increasingly prominent in certain southern parts of Canadian provinces such as Ontario, Quebec, Manitoba, and Nova Scotia. According to Canadian published studies, other environmental factors are contributing to the expansion of the Ixodes scapularis home range which include the introduction of the vector through migratory birds and density of deer populations.

West Nile virus 
West Nile virus is transferred between mosquitos and birds of prey including eagles, hawks, falcons, and owls. In the United States, West Nile Virus is being increasingly studied in New York and Connecticut due to the effects of climate change on two disease carrying vectors. Climate change is promoting the hybridization amongst two mosquito vectors (C. pipiens and C. quinquefasciatus) which can have an effect on the genetic composition of the hybrid allowing it to become more effective at transmitting diseases and increases its adaptability to different climactic conditions.

See also

References

Bibliography 

 
 

 
 
 

 
 

 
 
 
 

 

 
 
 
 
 

 
 
 
 

 
 

 
 
 
 

 
 

 
 
 
 
 
 

 
 

 
 

 

 
Epidemiology